Hans Neuburg (20 March 1904 – 24 June 1983) was a graphic designer instrumental in the development of the International Typographic Style.

Biography

Neuburg was born in Králíky, Austria-Hungary and grew up in Zürich where he attended the Orell Füssli Art Institute. Following his graduation, he worked as a designer in advertising and publishing. In 1936, Neuburg opened his own studio in Zurich. In 1958, he became a founding member of Neue Grafik, a quarterly design publication.

References

Swiss graphic designers
German Bohemian people
1904 births
1983 deaths
People from Ústí nad Orlicí District
Austro-Hungarian emigrants to Switzerland